The Best of Enemies is a 2019 American drama film directed and written by Robin Bissell in his feature debut. It is based on the book The Best of Enemies: Race and Redemption in the New South by Osha Gray Davidson, which focuses on the rivalry between civil rights activist Ann Atwater and Ku Klux Klan leader C. P. Ellis. The film stars Taraji P. Henson, Sam Rockwell, Babou Ceesay, Anne Heche, Wes Bentley, Bruce McGill, John Gallagher Jr., and Nick Searcy. It was released in the United States on April 5, 2019, by STX Entertainment.

Plot 
In 1971 in Durham, North Carolina, Ann Atwater tries to get better housing conditions for poor black people, and is ignored by the all-white judge panel. C.P. is the president of the KKK, and cares for his children. Ann's daughter's school catches on fire, and C.P. is afraid that the black children will come to the white schools. Bill Riddick sets up a meeting with the both of them, to arrange charrettes to discuss segregation and other issues.

At first, both of them refuse since they hate each other, but then they are convinced. C.P. is a proud racist and refuses to sit with Bill and Ann, since they are black and he is white.

They agree to pick some people randomly from the group to vote on the issues at the end of the meeting sessions. C.P tries to talk to these selected to vote, but is rebuffed. A black reverend asks Bill if he can play gospel music at the end of each session. C.P. refuses, saying that if the blacks want to sing gospel music at the charrette, he should be allowed to put out his KKK items to display. Ann refuses, but Bill agrees.

At one meeting, a group of black teenagers tries to destroy the KKK items, but Ann stops them and tells them to instead understand what the KKK is. C.P. observes.

Bill makes the blacks and whites in their group sit next to each other in the cafeteria and eat. He makes C.P and Ann sit together alone. They eat in tense silence, then Ann asks C.P. if he has a boy in Murdock. C.P. says that he won't talk about his boy. Murdock is a facility that takes care of disabled boys, and his son has Down Syndrome.

C.P. rushes to Murdock. His son Larry has been put in the same room with another boy who is screaming, upsetting Larry. C.P. demands that his son be placed in a room of his own, but the nurses say he can't afford it. Ann visits Larry and asks a favor from Bernadette, who works there, to put Larry in his own room.

Bill takes Ann, C.P., and the rest of their group to visit the black school that was burned. C.P. is shocked by the damage. Ann's daughter says hi to Ann, but looks at C.P like he's evil when she finds out who he is. C.P.'s wife, Mary, is overjoyed with Ann's help, and goes to visit her to thank her. Ann asks her if C.P. has always been racist, and Mary says yes.

The night before the final vote, C.P.'s KKK troublemaking friends threaten the selected voters to vote for segregation. C.P. finds out about this and is dismayed. Ann also finds about it and screams at C.P., calling him a coward.

During the voting, all the issues pass, coming down to the final issue of desegregation. One by one, the voters vote. Ann votes for it, and C.P., surprising everyone, does the same, realizing the KKK is hateful. Also, he makes a speech and rips up his KKK membership card, much to the fury of his watching KKK friends. They threaten him and try to set fire to the gas station he owns but C.P. douses it. But the white community shuns his station, losing business. Ann and Bill visit him and they bring in the black community to buy from him instead.

The real life Ann and C.P. went around to different cities together, to talk about their experiences and remained friends to the end of C.P.'s life, with Ann giving the eulogy at his funeral.

Cast 
 Taraji P. Henson as Ann Atwater, a community organizer in Durham
 Sam Rockwell as C. P. Ellis
 Wes Bentley as Floyd Kelly
 Babou Ceesay as Bill Riddick
 Anne Heche as Mary Ellis
 Bruce McGill as Carvie Oldham 
 John Gallagher Jr. as Lee Trombley
 Nick Searcy as Garland Keith
 Afemo Omilami as Franklin Mose
 Sope Aluko as Henrietta Kaye
 Carson Holmes as Kenneth Wade Ellis

Production 
In June 2015, it was announced that Taraji P. Henson and Sam Rockwell would star in a civil rights drama, an adaptation of Osha Gray Davidson's history The Best of Enemies: Race and Redemption in the New South. Robin Bissell was attached to make his directorial debut from his own script. Filming began on May 22, 2017, in Georgia. In July 2018, STX Entertainment acquired the film's domestic distribution rights. Producers on the film were Danny Strong, Fred Bernstein, Matt Berenson, Bissell, Dominique Telson, and Material Pictures' Tobey Maguire and Matthew Plouffe. The trailer was released on October 11, 2018.

Release 
The Best of Enemies was released in the United States on April 5, 2019, by STX Entertainment, and was released on DVD and Blu-ray on June 18, 2019.

Reception

Box office 
The Best of Enemies grossed $10.2 million in North America and $11,831 in other territories, against a production budget of $10 million.
In the United States and Canada, The Best of Enemies was released alongside Shazam! and Pet Sematary, and was projected to gross $6–12 million from 1,705 theaters in its opening weekend. It made $1.6 million on its first day, including $265,000 from Thursday night previews. It ended up debuting to just $4.4 million, finishing sixth at the box office. The film fell 55% in its second weekend to $2 million, finishing tenth.

Critical response 
The website's critical consensus reads, "The Best of Enemies has the best of intentions, but they're derailed by a problematic perspective and a disappointing lack of insight." On Metacritic, the film has a score of 49 out of 100, based on 25 critics, indicating "mixed or average reviews". Audiences polled by CinemaScore gave the film an average grade of "A" on an A+ to F scale, while those at PostTrak gave it an overall positive score of 82% and a "definite recommend" of 70%.

References

External links 

The Best of Enemies  at STX Entertainment

The Best of Enemies at History vs. Hollywood

2019 directorial debut films
2019 films
American biographical drama films
2019 biographical drama films
STX Entertainment films
Films produced by Tobey Maguire
Drama films based on actual events
Films about the Ku Klux Klan
Films based on non-fiction books
Films scored by Marcelo Zarvos
Films set in 1971
Films set in North Carolina
Films shot in Georgia (U.S. state)
2019 drama films
2010s English-language films
2010s American films